Vice Admiral Harish Chandra Singh Bisht, PVSM, AVSM, ADC is a former Flag Officer of the Indian Navy. He is an alumnus of the Sainik School Ghorakhal, Nainital; National Defence Academy Khadakvasla, Pune and the Naval Academy, Kochi and served as the Flag Officer Commanding-in-Chief, Eastern Naval Command till his retirement on 31 October 2017.

Education
Bisht has done his schooling from Sainik School Ghorakhal, Nainital and is a graduate of the Royal Naval Staff College, Greenwich (UK), 1992 batch. He also attended the Naval Higher Command Course at the College of Naval Warfare, Karanja, Mumbai in 2001 and completed the 47th NDC course at New Delhi in 2007.

He is also an alumnus of the National Defence Academy, one of the most prestigious military institutions of India.

Career
Bisht was commissioned in the Executive Branch of the Indian Navy as a Surface Warfare Officer on 1 July 1979. He has done a number of important afloat, training and staff appointments.

Notable appointments include executive officer of the ASW Corvette Ajay, Cdr Work Up in the Indian Naval Work Up Team at Kochi and Fleet Gunnery Officer of the Eastern Fleet at Visakhapatnam.

He commissioned the Missile Corvette INS Kora as the commanding officer and has also commanded the Stealth Frigate, INS Tabar.

His important Training/ Staff appointments include Training Commander INS Dronacharya at Kochi, Deputy Director Naval Plans and Naval Assistant to the Vice Chief of the Naval Staff at IHQ, MoD (N) in the rank of Commander and thereafter as Director Naval Intelligence in the rank of Captain at IHQ, MoD (N). He has also been the DA at the High Commission of India, Singapore.

He was promoted to Flag rank on 28 January 2008 and took over the appointment of Assistant Controller of Carrier Projects at IHQ, MoD (N). His further Flag rank appointments include Chief of Staff, Southern Naval Command and Flag Officer Sea Training at Kochi, Flag Officer Commanding Eastern Fleet, at Visakhapatnam and Assistant Chief of Personnel (HRD) at IHQ, MoD (N).

He was promoted to the rank of Vice Admiral on 1 September 2012 and took over the appointment of the Controller Personnel Services (CPS) at IHQ, MoD (N). On 1 February 2015, he was appointed the Director General of Indian Coast Guard (DGICG). On 27 February 2016, he was appointed the Flag Officer Commanding-in-Chief, Eastern Naval Command.

He was awarded PVSM for his service in 2017.

Vice Admiral Bisht retired from service on 31 October 2017.

Awards and decorations 

Personal Life

Vice Admiral Bisht (retd.) and Mrs. Bisht have two daughters.

References

Indian Navy admirals
Flag Officers Commanding Eastern Fleet
Directors General of the Indian Coast Guard
Flag Officers Sea Training
Living people
Kumaoni people
Military personnel from Uttarakhand
People from Almora
Recipients of the Ati Vishisht Seva Medal
Recipients of the Param Vishisht Seva Medal
1957 births